University College Cork Rugby Football Club currently plays in Division 1B of the All-Ireland League. Founded in 1872, they originally played as Queen’s College Cork, as UCC was then known. Recent successes include winning the All Ireland U-20 Championship in 2002. In the same year, they also reached the AIB League playoffs for the first time, narrowly missing out on promotion to Division 1. Leading players in that team included Denis Leamy, Stephen Keogh and Frank Murphy, all of whom went on to play for Munster.

Honours

All-Ireland Cup
1935-36: 1
 Munster Senior League
1913, 1914, 1931, 1933. 1934, 1936, 1942 1943, 1945, 1950, 1961, 1962, 1963, 1974, 1978, 1981, 1985: 17
Munster Senior Cup
1887, 1888, 1897, 1900, 1901, 1912, 1913, 1935, 1936, 1937, 1939, 1941, 1950, 1951, 1955, 1963, 1976, 1981: 18
Munster Junior Cup
1921, 1933, 1950, 1953, 1963, 1967, 1969, 1975, 1977, 1979: 10

Notable former players

Ireland
In 1879 Ashley Cummins became the first UCC player to represent Ireland. Since then at least 55 UCC players have played for the full national team. 34 of these played for Ireland while still playing for UCC. Donal Lenihan was the last UCC player to be capped by Ireland while still attached to the club.

British & Irish Lions
As well as representing Ireland, at least nine UCC players also went on to represent the British & Irish Lions. At least two of these players, Mick Lane and Tom Kiernan, were still UCC players when they toured with the Lions.

References

External links 
Official site

Cork
Rugby
Cork
Rugby union clubs in County Cork
Cork
Senior Irish rugby clubs (Munster)
1872 establishments in Ireland